The 2018 Missouri Valley Conference baseball tournament was held from May 23 through 26.  All eight baseball-sponsoring schools in the conference participated in the double-elimination tournament that was held at Dallas Baptist's Horner Ballpark in Dallas, Texas.  The winner of the tournament earned the conference's automatic bid to the 2018 NCAA Division I baseball tournament.

Seeding and format
The league's eight teams were seeded based on conference winning percentage.  The teams played a two bracket, double-elimination format tournament, with the winner of each bracket then playing a single elimination final.

Results
{{8TeamBracket-2Elim-D
| sets=1/1/2/1

| RD1-seed01=1
| RD1-team01= Missouri State
| RD1-score01= 10
| RD1-seed02=8
| RD1-team02= Evansville
| RD1-score02= 0

| RD1-seed03=4
| RD1-team03= Indiana State
| RD1-score03= 9
| RD1-seed04=5
| RD1-team04= 
| RD1-score04= 7

| RD1-seed05= 5
| RD1-team05= Southern Illinois
| RD1-score05= 512
| RD1-seed06=8
| RD1-team06=Evansville
| RD1-score06=4

| RD1-seed07=2
| RD1-team07= Dallas Baptist
| RD1-score07= 10
| RD1-seed08=7
| RD1-team08= Valparaiso
| RD1-score08= 13

| RD1-seed09=3
| RD1-team09= Bradley
| RD1-score09= 14
| RD1-seed10=6
| RD1-team10= Illinois State
| RD1-score10= 2

| RD1-seed11=2
| RD1-team11= Dallas Baptist
| RD1-score11= 10
| RD1-seed12=6
| RD1-team12= Illinois State
| RD1-score12= 6

| RD2-seed01= 1
| RD2-team01=

References

Tournament
Missouri Valley Conference Baseball Tournament
Missouri Valley Conference baseball tournament
Missouri Valley Conference baseball tournament